Guegeegue Island is an island located in the Kwajalein Atoll of the Republic of the Marshall Islands. It is connected by causeway to Ebeye Island, the second most populated island in the nation, and is the northernmost island so connected.

The island is also known as Gugegwe (Marshallese:).

Gugeegue is just south of the Bigej Pass, which separates it from Bigej islet.

References

Further reading

External links 
 "Issues and Options in the Energy Sector". Annex E. July 31, 1992. The World Bank.

Kwajalein Atoll
Islands of the Marshall Islands